At least six ships of the Imperial Russian Navy have been named Ne Tron Menia (—"Touch me not").

 — that was broken up after 1739.
 — that was sold for scrap in 1875.
 — that was broken up after 1803.
 — that was broken up in 1828.
 — that was stricken in 1863.
  (1864)— that was scrapped in 1905.

Russian Navy ship names